Qasımbəyli (also, Kasymbeyli) is a village and municipality in the Sabirabad Rayon of Azerbaijan.  It has a population of 1,080.

References 

Populated places in Sabirabad District